Casey Grace Murphy (born April 25, 1996) is an American professional soccer player who plays as a goalkeeper for North Carolina Courage of the National Women's Soccer League.

Murphy played college soccer at Rutgers University. She was a starter for the United States under-20 national team during the 2016 FIFA U-20 Women's World Cup and has been a regular for the United States under-23 team. She was named to the United States national team in November 2022.

Early life
Murphy is the daughter of Michael and Jill Murphy and has a brother named Kyle. She first started playing soccer at the age of five. At around the age of 10, she started to play only as a goalkeeper. Raised in Bridgewater Township, New Jersey, Murphy attended and played soccer and basketball for Bridgewater-Raritan High School. She also trained with the PDA Slammers, part of the Elite Clubs National League. Murphy was the No. 18 overall player in New Jersey and was a four-star recruit. In 2014, she chose to attend Rutgers University.

Rutgers Scarlet Knights, 2014–2017
Murphy played for the Rutgers Scarlet Knights from 2014 to 2017. 
She redshirted her final year to compete in the U-20 FIFA World Cup. Murphy earned the Female Big Ten Medal of Honor in May 2018. Throughout her career, she earned several accolades and distinctions, including twice the Big Ten Goalkeeper of the Year, twice an All-Big Ten First Team selection, and twice an All-Region First Team honoree. Murphy was also named a 2017 Mac Hermann Trophy Semifinalist. With 45 clean sheets in her college career, Murphy is Rutgers' all-time leader for career shutouts and ranks second in Big Ten history.

Club career

Montpellier, 2018–2019
In January 2018, Murphy signed a professional contract with Montpellier HSC to play in France's Division 1 Féminine. She was initially expected to return to the NWSL and Sky Blue FC in June, but extended her contract with the team in April 2018. In her first season with Montpellier, Murphy started in 11 games. She also earned the Division 1 Best Keeper Award and was selected by French media as part of the league's Best XI. She also participated in both the Coupe de France Féminine and the UEFA Women's Champions League.

On May 20, 2018, Murphy was selected as goalkeeper of the year in Division 1 Féminine by the French Football Federation.

Reign FC, 2019–2020
On May 15, 2019, Murphy signed for Reign FC.

North Carolina Courage 2020-present
On October 22, 2020, Murphy was traded to the North Carolina Courage along with $140,000 in allocation money in exchange for Crystal Dunn.

International career
Murphy is a United States youth international at the U14, U15, U18, U20, and U23 levels. She represented the United States at the 2016 FIFA U-20 Women's World Cup.

Murphy received her first call-up to the United States women's national soccer team for a set of friendlies in June 2018 against China PR.

Murphy was again called up by USWNT Head Coach Vlatko Andonovski for the 2021 SheBelieves Cup.

Murphy was a part of the USWNT squad picked by Head Coach Vlatko Andonovski to travel to Australia in November 2021. She got her first cap on November 26, 2021 and recorded a clean sheet, and player of the match honors with multiple stunning saves.

Career statistics

International

Honors
United States
 CONCACAF Women's Championship: 2022
 SheBelieves Cup: 2021; 2022; 2023

References

External links
 

Living people
1996 births
American women's soccer players
Rutgers Scarlet Knights women's soccer players
United States women's under-20 international soccer players
United States women's international soccer players
NJ/NY Gotham FC draft picks
Women's association football goalkeepers
Montpellier HSC (women) players
Division 1 Féminine players
Bridgewater-Raritan High School alumni
People from Bridgewater Township, New Jersey
Soccer players from New Jersey
Sportspeople from Somerset County, New Jersey
American expatriate sportspeople in France
Expatriate women's footballers in France
OL Reign players
National Women's Soccer League players
North Carolina Courage players